Kamenica is a village in Leposavic municipality, northern Kosovo.

Notes

Villages in Leposavić
Serb communities in Kosovo